Estadio Municipal Casto Martínez Laguarda is a multi-sports stadium in San José de Mayo, Uruguay.  It is currently used mostly for football matches, and also for track and field competitions and rugby union events.  The stadium holds 3,800 people. It is the home stadium of the local team.

References

Buildings and structures in San José Department
Municipal Casto Martinez Laguarda
Municipal Casto Martinez Laguarda
Sport in San José Department